Asaccus griseonotus, also known as the grey-spotted leaf-toed gecko or grey-marked gecko, is a species of lizard in the family Phyllodactylidae. It is found in Iraq and Iran.

References

Asaccus
Reptiles of Iran
Reptiles of Iraq
Reptiles described in 1973
Taxa named by Steven C. Anderson
Taxa named by James R. Dixon